Andra Kareem Manson (born April 30, 1984) is a male high jumper from the United States. His personal best jump is 2.35 metres, achieved in April 2009 in Austin. He has 2.33 on the indoor track, from February 2007 in Fayetteville.

Manson was raised in Brenham, Texas and went to Brenham High School, where he graduated from in 2002.  He excelled in basketball and track while in high school, setting the US high school record in the high jump, clearing 7' 7" on July 18, 2002. He was Track and Field News "High School Athlete of the Year" in 2002. Manson competed collegiately at the University of Texas.

Also appeared in the Beijing 2008 Olympics.

Achievements

References

External links
 
 
 
 
 
 

1984 births
Living people
American male high jumpers
African-American male track and field athletes
Olympic track and field athletes of the United States
Athletes (track and field) at the 2008 Summer Olympics
People from Brenham, Texas
Texas Longhorns men's track and field athletes
21st-century African-American sportspeople
20th-century African-American people